Dawn patrol may refer to:

In arts and entertainment

Film 
 The Dawn Patrol (1930 film), starring Richard Barthelmess and Douglas Fairbanks, Jr.
 The Dawn Patrol (1938 film), a remake featuring Errol Flynn and Basil Rathbone
 Dawn Patrol (2014 film), directed by Daniel Petrie, Jr. and starring Scott Eastwood

Gaming
 Dawn Patrol (board game), also known as Fight in the Skies
 Dawn Patrol (video game), a flight simulator game by Rowan Software
 The Dawn Patrol, a level in The Jungle Book (video game)

Music 
 Dawn Patrol, an alternate name for the Canadian band Odds
 "Dawn Patrol", a song by Megadeth from their album Rust in Peace
 Dawn Patrol (album), a 1982 album by Night Ranger

Radio and television 
 The Dawn Patrol (radio show), original name of the Californian morning radio show Dave, Shelly, and Chainsaw
 The Dawn Patrol, an early morning BBC Radio 2 show hosted by Sarah Kennedy
 "The Dawn Patrol", a morning radio show on WEBN in Cincinnati
 "The Dawn Patrol" (The O.C.), an episode of The O.C.

Other media 
 Dawn Patrol, a 2008 novel by Don Winslow
 The Dawn Patrol, a blog by American author Dawn Eden

Other uses 
 Operation Dawn Patrol, a five-nation naval and air exercise conducted in the Mediterranean in 1973
 Dawn Patrol, an event at the Albuquerque International Balloon Fiesta